Qeshlaq-e Mohammadlu (also Romanized as Qeshlāq-e Moḩammadlū; also known as Qeshlāq-e Moḩammad ‘Alī, Qeshlāq-e Moḩammadī, and Qishlāq Muhammad ‘Ali) is a village in Tankaman Rural District, Tankaman District, Nazarabad County, Alborz Province, Iran. At the 2006 census, its population was 71, in 15 families.

References 

Populated places in Nazarabad County